Odonax was a genus of Early Devonian (Early Emsian) zosterophyll with branching axes.
It bore kidney-shaped sporangia and spiny branches.

References 

Silurian plants
Early Devonian plants
Prehistoric lycophyte genera
Zosterophylls